The Congressman William L. Clay Sr. Bridge, formerly known as the Bernard F. Dickmann Bridge and popularly as the Poplar Street Bridge or PSB, completed in 1967, is a  deck girder bridge across the Mississippi River  between St. Louis, Missouri, and East St. Louis, Illinois. The bridge arrives on the Missouri shore line just south of the Gateway Arch.

Background

Planned just before construction of the Arch, the builders in 1959 were to request that  of the Gateway Arch property be turned over from the National Park Service for the bridge.  The request generated enormous controversy and ultimately  of the Jefferson Expansion National Memorial (which included all of the original platted area of St. Louis when it was acquired in the 1930s and 1940s) was given to the bridge.

Usage

Two Interstates and a U.S. Highway cross the entire bridge. Approximately 100,000 vehicles cross the bridge daily, making it the second most heavily used bridge on the river, after the I-94 Dartmouth Bridge in Minneapolis, Minnesota. Some of that load has been diverted to the Stan Musial Veterans Memorial Bridge since its opening in 2014.

Routes and highways

I-55, I-64 and U.S. Route 40 (US 40) cross the Mississippi on the Poplar Street Bridge. US 66 also ran concurrently over this bridge until 1979, and US 50 was routed over it before the Interstates were constructed. In addition, I-70 crossed the river here until 2014, when it was realigned to cross the river on the Stan Musial Veterans Memorial Bridge when it was completed. I-44 now follows  the old alignment of I-70 through downtown to the west approach for the Stan Musial Veterans Memorial Bridge although motorists traveling east on I-44 must continue west on I-70 and do not have a direct connection to the bridge (any access to eastbound I-70 requires using the Poplar Street Bridge).

The traffic was heavily congested until the opening of the new bridge in early February 2014. In 2012, 123,564 vehicles used it every day, but after the new bridge opened, congestion alleviated by almost 14%, less than the predicted 20% decline with 106,500 vehicles using it every day because total traffic across the river from all bridges increased by 7.4% over 2013 levels.

Historical areas

The east end of the bridge crosses the south end of what was Bloody Island which Robert E. Lee connected to the mainland of Illinois with landfill in the 1850s.  During its island days several Missouri politicians fought duels there.  What was Bloody Island is now a train yard.

Name

Although the bridge's former name honors former St. Louis mayor Bernard F. Dickmann, it is most commonly referred to as the Poplar Street Bridge, with many locals unaware of its official name. The Missouri end of the bridge sits over Poplar Street, and the media started referring to it by that name long before the bridge opened due to the fact that the bridge was built over Poplar Street.

It was officially renamed as the Congressman William L. Clay Sr. Bridge in October 2013 in honor of Bill Clay.

See also 
 
 
 
 
 List of crossings of the Upper Mississippi River
 McKinley Bridge
 Eads Bridge
 Martin Luther King Bridge

References

External links 

Bridges completed in 1967
Road bridges in Illinois
Bridges over the Mississippi River
East St. Louis, Illinois
Interstate 64
Interstate 55
U.S. Route 40
Bridges in St. Louis
Bridges on the Interstate Highway System
Bridges on U.S. Route 66
Steel bridges in the United States
Bridges in St. Clair County, Illinois
Road bridges in Missouri
Bridges of the United States Numbered Highway System
U.S. Route 50
Interstate 70
Girder bridges in the United States
1967 establishments in Missouri
1967 establishments in Illinois
Interstate vehicle bridges in the United States